Ilumatobacter fluminis is a Gram-positive, aerobic, rod-shaped, and non-motile bacterium from the genus Ilumatobacter, which has been isolated from sediments from the mouth of the Kuiragawa River in Japan.

References

External links 
Type strain of Ilumatobacter fluminis at BacDive -  the Bacterial Diversity Metadatabase

Actinomycetota
Bacteria described in 2009